Mountains are an American drone band, originally from Chicago but now based in New York. Formed by school friends Brendon Anderegg and Koen Holtkamp, the band's first two albums appeared on their own label, Apestaartje, with subsequent releases being made on the Thrill Jockey label.

Discography

Albums
Mountains (Apestaartje, 2005)
Sewn (Apestaartje, 2006)
Choral (Thrill Jockey, 2009)
Air Museum (Thrill Jockey, 2011)
Centralia (Thrill Jockey, 2013)
Mountains Mountains Mountains (Thrill Jockey, 2013)

References

Musical groups established in 1999
American electronic music groups
1999 establishments in Illinois